Luke Flynn (born 1988, in Dubuque, Iowa) is an American composer of film, television, and concert music. He is most widely known for his compositions Rift, for orchestra, and Beneath the Wave, for SATB chorus.

In the film industry, he has composed the scores for several movies, including Holmes and Watson (2018); his film music credits include numerous other titles, such as Frozen II, Star Wars: The Rise of Skywalker, La La Land, and many others.

Flynn graduated summa cum laude from Butler University with a masters of music composition, where he studied with Michael Schelle, and was a graduate assistant in both music composition and music technologies. He graduated summa cum laude from Clarke University, with a Bachelor of Arts in music composition, where he studied with Amy Dunker, and was the recipient of the Francis J. O’ Connor Memorial Award, Clarke University's most prestigious award given to a single graduating senior. Flynn also studied music composition at 鹿児島国際大学, the International University of Kagoshima in Japan, with Japanese composer Tadashi Kubo.

Composition awards and accolades
(Winner, runner-up, or finalist)
Sandra Fivecoat Memorial Emerging Composer Contest (2020)
Illinois State University Red Note New Music Festival Composition Competition - Orchestra (2019)
Ithaca Choral Composition Contest (2018)
Reno Pops Orchestra Composition Contest (2018)
MidCities Chamber Singers Choral Composition Competition (2018)
Eastern Michigan University National Choral Composition Competition (2018)
CSUN Orchestra Northridge Composition Prize (2018)
Chorus Austin Young Composers Competition (2017)
Ball State University Festival of New Music Call for Works (2017)
Sydney Australia Contemporary Orchestra Call for Scores (2015)
Oklahoma Composers' Orchestra Inaugural Composition Contest (2015)
South Korean Busan Maru International Composition Contest (orchestra ) 부산마루국제음악제 (2015)
Minnesota Orchestra Composer Institute (2015)
Ablaze Records Orchestral Masters composition contest (2015)
Lexington Philharmonic New Music Experiment (2015)
Young New Yorkers' Chorus Composition Competition (2014)
12 Minutes of Fame Across the Universe Call for Scores (2014)
 The Indie Gathering “Best Original Film Score” Award (2014)
SCI/ASCAP Student Composition Competition (2013)
Imagine Music Pathways Composition Contest (2013)
American Prize in Composition (2013)
San Jose Choral Project Composition Competition (2012)
The Foundation for Sacred Music Composers International Composition Contest (2012)
New York International Composition Contest for Sacred Music (2011)
American College Theater Festival Best Original Score (2010)

List of compositions

Orchestral and large ensemble
Unease, Concert Band (2020)
Rift, Symphony Orchestra (2015)
It Was Then I Awoke, SSAA + String Orchestra + Perc. Ensemble (2014) 
Pervenire, String Orchestra (2015) 
Cloud Memories, Symphonic Band (2014)
Messier 82, Symphony Orchestra (2013) 
Quiet Snow, Symphony Orchestra (2009) 
Pioneer, Symphony Orchestra (2013) - Theme music commission for the Julien International Film Festival 
Sancta Caecilia, Symphonic Band + SATB (2010) 
Night Flight of the Specter, String Orchestra (2010) 
The Crusader Roar (University Fight Song), Wind Band + SATB (2011) 
Eyes Like Aster, Wind Band (2009)

Choral and vocal
Agnus Dei, SATB (2020)
Beneath the Wave, SATB (2011) 
White Moon, SATB (2017) - Commissioned by Choral Arts Initiative
The Hushed House, SATB (2014) - Commissioned by Young New Yorkers' Chorus
Ave Maria, SATB (2013) 
Windowsill Rain, Soprano + Piano (2011) Commission, 2011 by the Korea & Japan Annual International Exchange Art Songs Festival
Until Autumn..., SS+ Piano (2015) Commission, 2015 by the International Haiku Association, Japan

Chamber and small ensemble
Destiny March, Fl., Vln., Org. (2013) 
Snakebite, Bb Cl., Vln., Pno. (2013) 
Cleveland Park, Bb Tpt., Pno. (2011) 
Refè, Vln., Vla. I, Vla. II., Vc., Bsn. (2013) 
Frostbite, Bb Cl., Pno. (2013) 
Free Flight, Fl., Pno. (2012) 
Blue Bird, Fly Away, Vln., Vc. (2012)
Dance in the Summer Field, Brass Quintet (2010) 
As the River, Vc., Perc. (2011) 
Starlight Fanfare, Chamber Brass (2010) 
The Gamecock, Woodwind Quintet (2011) 
Credo, Bb Tpt., Pno. (2009)

Solo
Tabi 旅, Japanese Koto (2011)
Year of the Dragon, Piano (2012) 
I. Hatch 
II. Flight 
III. Flame 
Adding Flowers, Piano (2010)
Lost, Percussion Solo (2011)
I. Mesozoic Merengue (Marimba Solo) 
II. The Breaking of the Conch: The Savage Hunt (Timpani Solo) 
III. Fireworks Show (Snare Drum Solo) 
Marie, Piano (2009)

Filmography

Movies
Ghostbusters: Afterlife, 2021 (music preparation)
Tenet, 2020 (music preparation)
A Quiet Place II, 2020 (music preparation)
Jungle Cruise, 2020 (music preparation)
West Side Story 2021, 2021 (music preparation)
Onward, 2020 (music preparation)
The Call of the Wild, 2020 (music preparation)
Star Wars: The Rise of Skywalker, 2019 (music preparation)
Frozen II, 2019 (music preparation)
Doctor Sleep, 2019 (music preparation)
Gemini Man, 2019 (music preparation)
A Beautiful Day in the Neighborhood, 2019 (music preparation)
Just Mercy, 2019 (music preparation)
Ford v Ferrari, 2019 (music preparation)
Men in Black: International, 2019 (music preparation)
Toy Story 4, 2019 (music preparation)
Holmes & Watson, 2018 (Composer - additional music)
The Secret Life of Pets 2, 2019 (music preparation)
The Lego Movie 2: The Second Part, 2019 (music preparation)
Velvet Buzzsaw, 2019 (music preparation)
A Dog's Way Home, 2019 (music preparation)
Welcome to Marwen, 2018 (music preparation)
Mary Poppins Returns, 2018 (music preparation)
Creed II, 2018 (music preparation)
The Grinch, 2018 (music preparation)
Venom, 2018 (music preparation)
First Man, 2018 (music preparation)
Christopher Robin, 2018 (music preparation)
Solo: A Star Wars Story, 2018 (music preparation)
Avengers: Infinity War, 2018 (music preparation)
Ready Player One, 2018 (music preparation)
A Quiet Place, 2018 (music preparation)
Fifty Shades Freed, 2018 (music preparation)
The Post, 2018 (music preparation)
Star Wars: The Last Jedi, 2018 (music preparation)
Ferdinand, 2018 (music preparation)
Trolls Holiday, 2017 (music preparation)
Cars 3, 2017 (music preparation)
Captain Underpants: The First Epic Movie, 2017 (music preparation)
Logan, 2017 (music preparation)
Fantastic Beasts and Where to Find Them, 2016 (music preparation)
Trolls, 2016 (music preparation)
Storks, 2016 (music preparation)
La La Land, 2016 (music preparation)
Jason Bourn, 2016 (music preparation)
Ghostbusters, 2016 (music preparation)
X-Men: Apocalypse, 2016 (music preparation)
The Secret Life of Pets, 2016 (music preparation)
The BFG, 2016 (music preparation)
The Jungle Book, 2016 (music preparation)
The Nice Guys, 2016 (music preparation)
Florence Foster Jenkins, 2016 (music preparation)
The Huntsman: Winter's War, 2016 (music preparation)
Gods of Egypt, 2016 (music preparation)
Zoolander 2, 2016 (music preparation)
Monster Trucks, 2016 (music preparation)
The Finest Hours, 2016 (music preparation)
Star Wars: The Force Awakens, 2015 (music preparation)
Alvin and the Chipmunks: The Road Chip, 2015 (music preparation)
The Good Dinosaur, 2015 (music preparation)
The Hunger Games: Mockingjay - Part 2, 2015 (music preparation)
Ant-Man, 2015 (music preparation)
Creed, 2015 (music preparation)
Concussion, 2015 (music preparation)
The Peanuts Movie, 2015 (music preparation)
Maze Runner: The Scorch Trials, 2015 (music preparation)
Fantastic Four, 2015 (music preparation)

Television
The Mandalorian (music preparation)
The Simpsons (orchestrator; music preparation)
Family Guy (music preparation)
The Orville (music preparation)
American Dad! (music preparation)
Empire (music preparation)
Bates Motel (music preparation)
When We Rise (music preparation)
Son of Zorn (music preparation)

References

External links
Luke Flynn’s Homepage

21st-century American composers
1988 births
Living people